A referendum on introducing direct elections for the Presidency was held in Hungary on 29 July 1990. Although the proposal was supported by 85.9% of voters, turnout was just 14%, resulting in the referendum being declared invalid. As a result, the President continued to be elected by the National Assembly.

Results

References

1990 referendums
1990 in Hungary
Referendums in Hungary